Torokina Rural LLG is a local-level government (LLG) of the Autonomous Region of Bougainville, Papua New Guinea.

Wards
01. Burue
02. Naghareghe
05. Atsinima
06. Rotokas
07. Eivo

References

Local-level governments of the Autonomous Region of Bougainville